Poecilanthe parviflora, the lapachillo, is a species of flowering plant in the family Fabaceae. It is found in Argentina and Brazil.

References

Brongniartieae
Flora of Argentina
Flora of Brazil
Data deficient plants
Taxonomy articles created by Polbot